Philippe Joly (born 2 January 1976) is a French actor and screenwriter, born in Moscow, Russia. Joly is best known for his role as Zoltan in the 2015 film Pound of Flesh with Jean-Claude Van Damme and his role as Decimus in Jackie Chan’s film Dragon Blade directed by Daniel Lee, in which he appears alongside American actors John Cusack and Adrien Brody, and French singer/actress Lorie Pester.

Joly regularly plays the villain  in Action films in Asia, and appeared alongside major Hong Kong actors including; Chow Yun Fat, and Andy Lau. Recent projects include Juno Mak's latest film Sons of the Neon Night, and the Chinese Sci-fi action film Ultimate Code in which Joly plays a leading role as the main villain alongside a Chinese cast and fellow french actor and Parkour founder David Belle.

As well as acting, Joly has also written many screenplays, and produced and directed a few Independent films in Hong Kong. Joly speaks several languages (French, Russian, Italian and English), is an avid practitioner of close-up magic and card manipulation, and has trained in various Martial Arts since the age of 5. While not a stuntman, Joly often has to perform stunts as required by the Action film genre and the type of characters he plays. In the film Lust & Found, he choreographed the fight scene sequence.

Filmography

Films

Television

Short films

Modeling
Philippe occasionally works as a model for brands and advertising campaigns including:
Tai Pan Row - luxury tailor in Hong Kong
Kraftek - luxury Apple watch cases and bracelets
3D Robotics - 3DR Drone mini series
Hong Kong SAR 20th Anniversary - TV commercial "Together, Progress, Opportunity".
Rangerfone - Outdoor phone brand

Early years
Before becoming an actor and getting involved in the film industry, Philippe Joly was an entrepreneur and digital marketing expert.
He founded a number of technology start-ups in Ireland, Italy and Hong Kong, including:
Safebox - Award-winning  application that pioneered the field of mobile privacy in pre-smartphone Era
clickSUMO - Leading A2P messaging platform
EmerTech - Enabler of digital identity solutions using blockchain technologies.
Yeloworld - Mobile VoIP application acquired by Talk360  
SIMchronise - Mobile data synchronisation company that was part of the High Potential Start-Ups unit of Enterprise Ireland

He is also the author of a book on start-ups and entrepreneurship called "Potemkin, Inc.".

Philippe first got into films as a screenwriter. His first screenplay was "No Tomorrow", which he co-wrote with his friend Paolo Rizzardini.

References

External links
 
 Philippe Joly Official Website
 Impact Online: ‘VOR ! breaks out in Hong Kong’ (17 January 2014)
  VanDammeForum.com Entrevista exclusiva a Philippe Joly

1976 births
Living people
French male film actors